Aglish is a village in west County Waterford, Ireland.

Population
The population of the village almost doubled in size from 169 people as of the 2006 census, to 333 inhabitants by the 2016 census. According to the 2016 census, approximately 50% of the homes in Aglish (72 of 137 responding private households) were built between 2001 and 2010.

Location and access
Running through the village is the Geosh river, a tributary of the River Blackwater.

Religion
The village is home to a 19th-century Catholic church -  being the Irish-language word for "church" - with a former ruined church cited by the Dungarvan Leader newspaper to have been "pre-invasion". Remnants of two former ruined churches are still to be found alongside each other in the centre of the village, surrounded by an old graveyard dating back to at least 1700.

Amenities
Local amenities include a national school, village hall, two sports pitches one connected to school, and one pubs (The village inn).

Sport
Geraldines GAA is the local Gaelic Athletic Association club, and fields hurling and Gaelic football teams. Aglish also won three Waterford senior football titles in 1915, 1922 and 1923.
Paddy O'Brien is a singer from the area, who won Irish country music's Gold Star award in 1988.
An annual vintage rally was run in the area from 1980 to 1996, and was revived again in 2008.

See also
 List of towns and villages in Ireland
 Aglish, Ballinameela and Mount Stuart

References

External links
 Aglish National School (archived)
 Geraldines 2002 Glory (archived)

Towns and villages in County Waterford